Zarbdor is an urban-type settlement in Jizzakh Region, Uzbekistan. It is the seat of Zarbdor District.

References

Populated places in Jizzakh Region
Urban-type settlements in Uzbekistan